Syrtbyttnosi is a mountain in Skjåk Municipality in Innlandet county, Norway. The mountain is surrounded by several other notable mountains including Tundradalskyrkja and Tverrådalskyrkja to the southeast, Røykjeskarhøi and Rivenoskulen to the south, and Sprongeggi and Tverreggi to the northwest.

See also
List of mountains of Norway

References

Skjåk
Mountains of Innlandet